Tanner Hawkinson (born May 14, 1990) is a former American football offensive tackle who played in the National Football League (NFL). Hawkinson played in college at the University of Kansas. He was drafted by the Cincinnati Bengals.

Early years
Hawkinson was an all-state defensive lineman and tight end at McPherson High School in McPherson, Kansas, graduating in 2008.

College career
He was recruited to KU to play tight end, but moved to defense, and eventually ended up on the offensive line. He was a freshman All-American in 2009 at tackle for the University of Kansas protecting Todd Reesing's blind side. Hawkinson was also a second-team All Big-12 player as a senior in 2012. He had three coaches in his five years at KU in Mark Mangino, Turner Gill, and Charlie Weis.

Professional career
He was selected in the 5th round, 156th overall in the 2013 NFL Draft. Hawkinson was waived by Cincinnati as part of the final 53-man roster cuts on September 5, 2015.

On September 7, 2015, Hawkinson was signed to the San Francisco 49ers practice squad.

On April 4, 2016 Hawkinson was claimed off waivers by the Jacksonville Jaguars after having spent the 2015 season with the Philadelphia Eagles.

Hawkinson announced his retirement from the NFL at the age of 25 on April 15, 2016.

References

External links
Kansas Jayhawks bio

1990 births
Living people
American football offensive guards
American football offensive tackles
Kansas Jayhawks football players
Cincinnati Bengals players
San Francisco 49ers players
Philadelphia Eagles players
Jacksonville Jaguars players
Players of American football from Kansas
People from McPherson, Kansas